Saraswati Rout  is an Indian weightlifter .

References

External links

Living people
1995 births
Indian female weightlifters
Sportswomen from Odisha
21st-century Indian women
21st-century Indian people